Avtandil Noyevich Chkuaseli (born 31 December 1931 in Tbilisi; died 12 September 1994 in Tbilisi) was a Soviet football player.

Chkuaseli played his only game for USSR on 22 July 1952 in the 1952 Olympics game against Yugoslavia.

References

External links
  Profile

1931 births
1994 deaths
Footballers from Georgia (country)
Soviet footballers
Soviet Union international footballers
Soviet Top League players
FC Dinamo Tbilisi players
Footballers at the 1952 Summer Olympics
Olympic footballers of the Soviet Union
Footballers from Tbilisi
Association football forwards